This is a list of historic houses and buildings in Savannah, Georgia, that have their own articles or are on the National Register of Historic Places (NRHP).
 
Houses

 Owens–Thomas House (NRHP and National Landmark)
 Isaiah Davenport House (NRHP)
 Oliver Sturges House (NHRP)
 William Scarbrough House (NRHP and National Landmark)
 Green–Meldrim House (NRHP and National Landmark)
 Telfair Academy (NRHP)

 Other buildings

 Atlantic Greyhound Bus Terminal (NRHP)
 Central of Georgia Depot and Trainshed (NRHP and National Landmark)
 Central of Georgia Railway Company Shop Property (NRHP)
 Georgia State Railroad Museum (NRHP)
 Charity Hospital (NRHP)
 Tomochichi Federal Building and United States Courthouse (NRHP)
 First Bryan Baptist Church (NRHP)
 Hill Hall (Savannah State College) (NRHP)
 W. B. Hodgson Hall (NRHP)
 St. Philip African Methodist Episcopal Church (NRHP)

 Historic districts

 Juliette Gordon Low Historic District (NRHP and National Historic Landmark District)
 Carver Village Historic District (NRHP)
 Cuyler–Brownville Historic District (NRHP)
 Daffin Park–Parkside Place Historic District (NRHP)
 Eastside Historic District (NRHP)
 Fairway Oaks–Greenview Historic District (NRHP)
 Gordonston Historic District (NRHP)
 Isle of Hope Historic District (NRHP)
 Kensington Park–Groveland Historic District (NRHP)
 Pine Gardens Historic District (NRHP)
 Savannah Historic District (NRHP)
 Savannah Victorian Historic District (NRHP)
 Ardsley Park-Chatham Crescent Historic District

See also
 History of Savannah, Georgia
 Buildings in Savannah Historic District
 Historic Savannah Foundation
 National Register of Historic Places listings in Chatham County, Georgia